Debre Markos University (DMU) is a public research university in Debre Markos, Amhara Region, Ethiopia. It was established in 2005 and has been growing fast.

Overview
Debre Markos University (DMU) is a public research university in Debre Markos, Ethiopia.
DMU is located in the area endowed with pleasant weather, abundant natural resources including Choke Mountains water-shade which covers six different agro-ecology zones within  radius with various bio-diversity and the source of many tributaries to the Nile, and Upper Blue Nile Gorge.
DMU was established in January 2005. Two years later, DMU started the teaching-learning process within 760 regular students, 53 academic and 34 supportive staffs, 21 contract servants and its name officially declared as Debre Markos University. 
Currently, DMU has 51 undergraduate, 47 postgraduate, and 2 PhD programs in regular, continuing, and distance educations. These programs are given at three centers: Main campus at Debre Markos, Burie campus at Burie, and  Bichena at Bichena. DMU has been providing competitive and skilled graduates to the national and international organizations in 11 round graduation ceremonies in first and second-degree programs. In addition to these, 126 medical doctors graduated in three rounds.

The university currently has three campuses, five colleges, two schools, and three institutes.

Academics
The University has 9 colleges, institutes, and schools.

College of Social Science and Humanity
Amharic
English
History
Geography
Civics
Sociology
Psychology

Natural and Computational Science
 Biology
 Chemistry
 Mathematics
 Physics
 Sport Science
 Statistics
 Biotechnology
Geology

College of Business and Economics
 Economics
 Management
 Accounting and Finance

College of Agriculture and Natural Resource
 Natural Resource Management
 Rural Development
 Animal Science
 Plant Science
 Horticulture
 Agro Economics
 Agri Business
 Agro Forestry

College of Health Science
 Public Health
Pediatrics and child health Nursing
 Nursing
 Midwifery
 Pharmacy
 Health Informatics
 Human Nutrition and Food Science
 Environmental Health
 Medical Laboratory Science and Technology

Debre Markos Institute of Technology
 Civil Engineering
 Electrical and Computer Engineering
 Mechanical Engineering
 Construction Technology and Management
 Information Technology
 Hydraulics and Water Resource Engineering
 Software Engineering
 Computer Science
 Aerospace Engineering
 Chemical Engineering
 Information System
 Industrial Engineering
 Architecture 
 Biomedical Engineering

School of Law
 Law

School of Medicine 
 * MEDICINE
 *Medical Radiology Technology(MRT)
 *Anesthesia

Institute of Land Administration
  * Land Administration and Surveying
  * Real Property Valuation
School of postgraduate postgraduate in Environment and Land Resource Management

Partnership
 International

 National

 collaboration-areas

References
 http://www.dmu.edu.et

External links
 http://www.dmu.edu.et

Debre Markos
Educational institutions established in 2005
2005 establishments in Ethiopia
Universities and colleges in Amhara Region